The Exeter Group is a Permian lithostratigraphic group (a sequence of rock strata) which occurs through East Devon in southwest England. The name is derived from the city of Exeter in Devon which is partly underlain by rocks of this age.

Outcrops
These rocks are found along the coast of East Devon and northwards to the Tiverton trough.

Lithology and stratigraphy
The Group comprises over 700m of sedimentary breccias with subordinate sandstones. It is divided into numerous formations: the Dawlish Formation, Monkerton Formation, Heavitree Breccia, Alphington Breccia, Whipton Formation, Knowle Sandstone, Shute Sandstone, Yellowford Formation, Crediton Breccia, Thorverton Sandstone, Cadbury Breccia, Newton St Cyres Formation, Creedy Park Sandstone, and Bow Breccia. The Cadbury Breccia may be Carboniferous in age. The Wytch Farm Breccia proved in a borehole to the east is also assigned to the Group.

References

Geological groups of the United Kingdom
Geologic formations of England
Permian System of Europe
Geology of Devon